Tamara Ilyinichna Sinyavskaya (born 6 July 1943, in Moscow) is a Russian mezzo-soprano from the Bolshoi Theatre.

She was awarded the title of People's Artist of the USSR in 1982. In 1997, planet 4981 Sinyavskaya was named in her honor.

She was married to Soviet Azerbaijani singer Muslim Magomayev.

References

External links
Sinyavskaya on the Bolshoi Theatre website
Sinyavskaya Webpage
Russian singer Tamara Sinyavskaya on YouTube (Softpanorama)
Links to her CDs

1943 births
Living people
Operatic mezzo-sopranos
Russian mezzo-sopranos
Soviet women opera singers
People's Artists of the USSR
People's Artists of Azerbaijan
Singers from Moscow
Russian music educators
Women music educators